Kibra Constituency is an electoral constituency in Nairobi, one of 17 constituencies in the county, and has an area of 12.1 km². It is located to the southwest of the City of Nairobi, and includes most of the Kibera slum and adjoining estates. The constituency was created prior to the 2013 general election. 

Kibra is a Nubian word meaning 'forest' or 'jungle'. The Nubians have lived in what is now Kibra since the end of the Second World War, when they were allocated land by the British colonial government.

The entire constituency is within Nairobi City County. It was part of Lang'ata and Dagoretti constituencies until prior to the 2013 general elections, when it was designated a separate area by the Independent Electoral and Boundaries Commission. It is bordered by Lang'ata Constituency to the south and west, Dagoretti North Constituency to the north, Dagoretti South Constituency to the northwest and Starehe Constituency to the east.

Members of Parliament

Wards
The constituency is made up of five wards, each of which elects a representative to the Nairobi County Assembly.

Kibra Sub-county
The Sub-county shares the same boundaries with the constituency. The Sub-county is headed by the sub-county administrator, appointed by a County Public Service Board.

References

External links 
Social audit of the constituency

Constituencies in Nairobi
2013 establishments in Kenya
Constituencies established in 2013